Olivia Meunier (born 13 December 1986) is a French badminton player.

Achievements

BWF International Challenge/Series 
Women's singles

  BWF International Challenge tournament
  BWF International Series tournament
  BWF Future Series tournament

References

External links 
 

1986 births
Living people
French female badminton players
21st-century French women